Sharif Hussain, who used the pseudonym Nasīm Hijāzī (Urdu: , commonly transliterated as Naseem Hijazi or Nasim Hijazi) (19 May 1914 – 2 March 1996), was an Urdu novelist.

Life and career
Hussain was born in an Arain family in the village of Sujaanpur, near the town of Dhariwal, in the Gurdaspur district of Punjab, in pre-partition India. He migrated to Pakistan after partition in 1947. He chose Islamic history as the inspiration for his novels.

Among the notable writers of his time, Ibn-e-Safi, Saadat Hasan Manto, and Shafiq-ur-Rehman were his popular contemporaries. He lived most of his life in Pakistan and died on 2 March 1996.

Naseem Hijazi died on 2 March 1996 at the age of 81 in Rawalpindi, Pakistan.

Writing
Naseem Hijazi used historic settings as the background for his novels and based most of his work on Islamic history, demonstrating both the rise and fall of the Islamic Empire. His novels Muhammad Bin Qasim, Aakhri Ma'raka, Qaisar-o Kisra, and Qafla-i Hijaz describe the era of Islam's rise to political, militaristic, economic, and educational power, while Yusuf Bin Tashfain, Shaheen, Kaleesa Aur Aag, and Andheri Raat Ke Musafir describe the period of the Spanish Reconquista.

In Akhri Chataan, he depicts the Central Asian conquests of Genghis Khan and his destruction of the Khwarizm Sultanate.

Hijazi wrote two sequential novels on the British Raj, and described the shortcomings of many nations within India after the collapse of the Mughal Empire. The novel Mu'azzam Ali starts a little before the Battle of Plassey. The lead character, Muazzam Ali, joins the fight against the British with the army of Siraj-ud-Daula. The story progresses as the character moves from one place in India to another in search of lost glory and freedom. He takes part in the third battle of Panipat and finally settles in Srirangapattana, which is growing in power under the towering personality of Haider Ali. The book ends around the death of Ali. The second book on the battles in the same area, Aur Talwar Toot Gayee (And the Sword Broke), is about Haider's son Sultan Tipu, where the same character is finding his dreams being fulfilled in Tipu's valiant endeavours against the British East India Company. The book culminates in Sultan Tipu's sad and untimely martyrdom.

Hijazi also wrote the novel Khaak aur Khoon, which details the violence caused by religious tensions between Muslims, Sikhs, and Hindus at the time of the partition of British India and the Independence of Pakistan in 1947.

Although some historians have accused him of distorting historical facts in his novels, he has influenced many readers inside and outside Pakistan.

Publications

Selected adaptations
 Shaheen

Awards and recognition
 Pride of Performance Award by the President of Pakistan in 1992.

References

1914 births
1996 deaths
Urdu-language novelists
Pakistani historical novelists
Punjabi people
20th-century novelists
Pakistani dramatists and playwrights
20th-century Urdu-language writers
Urdu-language writers from Pakistan
Urdu-language historical novelists
Recipients of the Pride of Performance
Urdu-language travel writers
Pakistani travel writers